Julien François (born 21 September 1979) is a retired French professional footballer who played as a midfielder.

Career
Born in Metz, Julien started his career at FC Metz, and also played for Gazélec Ajaccio and Grenoble, in Ligue 2. He played at Grenoble for four seasons before returning to FC Metz in the summer of 2006. He signed for Tours FC in January 2009. In June 2010, AC Le Havre signed the midfielder on a two-year contract, he joined on a free transfers from Tours FC.

References

External links
 
 
 

1979 births
Living people
Footballers from Metz
Association football midfielders
French footballers
Gazélec Ajaccio players
FC Metz players
Grenoble Foot 38 players
Tours FC players
Le Havre AC players
Ligue 1 players
Ligue 2 players
Championnat National players